Roger Bacon High School is a high school in St. Bernard, Ohio, United States, based in the Franciscan tradition.

This high school was dedicated in 1928, and was under the administration of and staffed by the Brothers and Priests of the Order of Friars Minor, and lay men and women. The school was named in honor of Roger Bacon, a Franciscan friar and English philosopher who placed considerable emphasis on empiricism, and has been presented as one of the earliest advocates of the modern scientific method.

Our Lady of Angels High School was the sister school to Roger Bacon, and was located several hundred yards northeast from campus. OLA was also dedicated in 1928, and due to changing demographics and smaller enrollment, closed its doors for good after the graduating class of 1984. (Google Earth lists OLA, even though the school has closed and the building has been torn down.) That year, Roger Bacon High School became co-educational, and Roger Bacon welcomed the Our Lady of Angels students and alumnae into their family. The class of 1988 was the first four-year co-ed class to graduate from Roger Bacon High School.

Academics 
The curriculum is accredited by the Ohio Department of Education and the Ohio Catholic School Accrediting Association.

Athletics

Ohio High School Athletic Association State Championships

 Boys' baseball - 1935 
 Boys' basketball - 1982, 2002 
 Boys' soccer - 1989, 1990 
 Girls' basketball - 1995 
 Girls' volleyball - 2001, 2004, 2005

Notable alumni 
Notable alumni include:

Mel Anthony (b.1943), former football player, University of Michigan
Adrian Breen (b.1965), former football player, Cincinnati Bengals (NFL)
 Moe Burtschy (1922 – 2004), baseball player, Philadelphia Athletics (MLB)
 Thomas J. Fogarty M.D. (b.1934), surgical instrumentation inventor; Thomas Fogarty Winery proprietor
 Marc Edward Heuck (b.1969), actor known for his role on Beat the Geeks TV game show on Comedy Central
Pat Kelsey, head coach of Winthrop University's men's basketball team
 Tom Kramer (b.1968), former baseball player, Cleveland Indians (MLB)
 Robert Ruwe (b.1941), former senior judge of the United States Tax Court
 B.J. Sander (b.1980), former football player, Green Bay Packers (NFL)
Milt Stegall (b.1970), former football player, Cincinnati Bengals (NFL) and Winnipeg Blue Bombers (CFL)
Adolphus Washington (b.1994), football player, Miami Dolphins (NFL)
John C. Willke (1925 – 2015), physician and anti-abortion activist.

References

External links
http://www.rogerbacon.org
http://www.rogerbaconalumni.com
Google map of Roger Bacon

Roman Catholic Archdiocese of Cincinnati
Educational institutions established in 1928
High schools in Hamilton County, Ohio
Private schools in Cincinnati
Catholic secondary schools in Ohio
1928 establishments in Ohio